Marripudi may refer to:

 Marripudi, Guntur, India
 Marripudi, Prakasam, India